Operation Green Sea was an amphibious attack on Conakry, the capital of Guinea, by between 350 and 420 Portuguese soldiers and Portuguese-led Guinean fighters in November 1970. The goals of the operation included the overthrow of Ahmed Sékou Touré's government, capture of the leader of the African Party for the Independence of Guinea and Cape Verde (PAIGC), Amílcar Cabral, destruction of the naval and air assets of the PAIGC and its Guinean supporters, and the rescue of Portuguese POWs held in Conakry.

The attackers withdrew after rescuing the POWs and destroying some PAIGC ships and Guinean Air Force infrastructure, but failed to capture Amílcar Cabral, the leader of PAIGC guerrillas, or to topple the regime of Guinean leader Ahmed Sékou Touré.

Background

In 1952, Ahmed Sékou Touré became the leader of the Guinean Democratic Party (PDG). In 1957, Guinea had an election in which the PDG won 56 of 60 seats. The PDG conducted a plebiscite in September 1958 by which Guineans overwhelmingly opted for immediate independence rather than for continued association with France. The French withdrew and, on 2 October 1958, Guinea proclaimed itself a sovereign and independent republic with Touré as its president.

In 1960, Touré welcomed to Guinea and supported Amílcar Cabral and his organization, the PAIGC, which was seeking the independence of Portuguese Guinea (now Guinea-Bissau) and Cape Verde from the Portuguese Empire. In 1963, the PAIGC began the Guinea-Bissau War of Independence.

Attack

On the night of 21–22 November 1970 about 200 armed Guineans—attired in uniforms similar to those of the Guinean Army and commanded by Portuguese officers—and 220 African-Portuguese and Portuguese soldiers invaded some points around Conakry. The soldiers landed from four unmarked ships, including an LST and a cargo vessel, and destroyed 4 or 5 supply vessels of the PAIGC. Others landed near President Touré's summer house, which they burnt. The invaders concentrated on destroying the headquarters of the African Party for the Independence of Guinea-Bissau and the Cape Verde Islands (Partido Africano da Independência da Guiné e do Cabo-Verde — PAIGC) in an unsuccessful attempt to capture PAIGC leader Amilcar Cabral, who was in Europe at the time. Others seized the political prison camps and liberated a number of prisoners, including Portuguese soldiers and airmen who had been captured earlier by PAIGC forces and turned over to the Guineans for safekeeping; some had been held captive in these camps for as long as seven years. The main attacking force reached but ignored the airport and apparently attacked what they thought was the operative radio station, unaware that its use had been discontinued when replaced earlier by a new station.

Touré was in the Presidential Palace at the time. Other soldiers captured two army posts, took control of the city's main power plant, captured the headquarters of the PAIGC (but not Amílcar Cabral), and freed 26 Portuguese POWs who were being held by the PAIGC at Camp Boiro. Guinean militia forces fought the raiders with little success. Since both Cabral and Touré couldn't be found, the Portuguese raiders retreated after suffering minor casualties.

At this point, half of the invading force withdrew with the released prisoners to the waiting ships, leaving the task of overthrowing the Guinean government to a force estimated at fewer than 150 men. This group apparently hoped for an uprising by the population, but such a reaction failed to occur. Outside observers have speculated that public support was not achieved because the invaders failed to seize the right radio station, which continued to operate under government control. Moreover, most important government or party officials avoided capture.

Consequences

Internal purges in Guinea
Within a week of the invasion, Touré set up a ten-person committee: the Haut-Commandement (High Command). Staffed with loyal members of the Political Bureau, the High Command ran Guinea by decree. The High Command oversaw arrests, detentions without trial, and executions. The High Command's actions decimated the ranks of government and police officials. Notable among the victims were the President of the Central Bank of the Republic of Guinea and the Minister of Finance Ousmane Baldé. After a five-day trial, on 23 January 1971, the Supreme Revolutionary Tribunal ordered 29 executions (carried out three days later), 33 death sentences in absentia, 68 life sentences at hard labor, and 17 orders of confiscation of all property.

The captured Guinean nationals who joined the Portuguese-African troops and had defected to the Portuguese side of the operation received life sentences at hard labor in Guinea. Eighty-nine of those charged were released, but dissidents say some people "disappeared" into prison or were executed extrajudicially. Those sentenced to execution included members of the governing party (including the neighbourhood party chiefs in Conakry), Conakry's Chief of Police, a secretary to the President, an assistant minister of finance, and at least five Guinean soldiers. Those who had their property confiscated were either French or Lebanese. The fate of other Europeans who were arrested is unknown. Among those who received life sentences were former government Ministers, heads of state industries, a former regional governor, and the top two officials of the National Museum.

In July 1971, Touré purged the army of some of its officers. In April 1973, he purged his regime of some of its ministers.

Political condemnation
On 8 December 1970, the UN Security Council passed Resolution 290, which condemned Portugal for the invasion of Guinea, and called upon Portugal to respect the principles of self-determination and independence with regard to Portuguese Guinea. On 11 December 1970, the Organization of African Unity (OAU) passed a resolution unanimously condemning the invasion.

Nigeria and Algeria offered support to Guinea-Conakry and the Soviet Union sent war ships to the area (known by NATO as the West Africa Patrol) to prevent further military operations against Touré's regime and against the PAIGC bases in Guinea.

Further reading
 António Luís Marinho. Operação Mar Verde - um documento para a história. Lisbon: Temas e Debates, 2006. 8°. 
 'Mar Verde': revelados documentos sobre operação militar ainda secreta. Manuel Carlos Freire. Diário de Notícias. 17 April 2006.
 "Guinea Reports Invasion From Sea by Portuguese; Lisbon Denies Charge U.N. Council Calls for End to Attack Guinea Reports an Invasion From Sea by Portuguese" by the Associated Press, The New York Times, 23 November 1970, Monday Page 1, 644 words.
 (German) Cord Eberspächer/Gerhard Wiechmann : Systemkonflikt in Afrika. Deutsch-deutsche Auseinandersetzungen im Kalten Krieg am Beispiel Guineas 1969-1972 (System conflict in Africa. German-German clashes in the Cold War by the example of Guinea 1969–1972) in : Zeitschrift des Forschungsverbundes SED-Staat, Nr. 23, Berlin 2008, ISSN 0948-9878, p. 30-41.
 (German) Adalbert Rittmueller: "Portugal schoss, die DDR gewann, die Bundesrepublik verlor". Die Rolle der DDR beim Abbruch der diplomatischen Beziehungen durch Guineas 1970/1971 ("Portugal shot, GDR won, FRG lost" - GDR's role in cutting diplomatic relations by Guinea 1970/1971), in: Zeitschrift des Forschungsverbundes SED-Staat, Nr. 27, Berlin 2010, ISSN 0948-9878, p. 230-147.

See also
António de Spínola: Governor of Portuguese Guinea at the time.
Frente Leste
Operation Gordian Knot
Operation Ivory Coast, a similar raid by the U.S. Army into North Vietnam to rescue American POW's
Portuguese Colonial War
United Nations Security Council Resolution 290
United Nations Security Council Resolution 295: 3 August 1971 resolution regarding continued border incursions.

References

External links

Recollections of Portuguese soldiers
 João Tunes. Guiné 63/74 - DCCXXXII: Onde é que vocês estavam em 22 de Novembro de 1970 ? Luís Graça & Camaradas da Guiné, 4 May 2006. Retrieved 2008-03-18.
 João Tunes. DA HORA DOS AVENTUREIROS, 2 May 2006. Retrieved 2008-03-18.
 Carlos Fortunato. Operação Mar Verde - 22 November 1970, Crónica de Carlos Fortunato, ex-furriel da CCaç. 13. 24 February 2003, revised 21 July 2006. Retrieved 2008-03-18.

Green Sea
History of Guinea
History of Guinea-Bissau
Conakry
1970 in Portugal
1970 in Guinea
Green Sea
Guinea-Bissau
Failed assassination attempts in Africa
Wars involving Guinea
Coup d'état attempts in Africa
Portuguese Guinea
Portuguese Colonial War
Green Sea
November 1970 events in Africa